Union Township Works II is a registered historic site near Pisgah, Ohio, listed in the National Register on October 7, 1971.

Historic uses 
Graves/Burials

Notes 

Cemeteries on the National Register of Historic Places in Ohio
National Register of Historic Places in Butler County, Ohio